Barokk Hotel Promenád Győr is a 4 stars hotel in Győr, a popular spa town in Hungary.

The hotel is located in the historic city center 

and the origins of its building are from 17th century.

See also 
List of hotels in Hungary

References

External links 
Homepage
Location on Google Maps.

Hotels in Hungary